Alison Murray Paterson (born 29 May 1966) is a British rower. She competed in the women's eight event at the 1992 Summer Olympics.

References

External links
  (1991 World Championships}
  (1992 Olympic Games)
 
 
 

1966 births
Living people
British female rowers
Olympic rowers of Great Britain
Rowers at the 1992 Summer Olympics
Sportspeople from Edinburgh